The extensor carpi radialis longus is one of the five main muscles that control movements at the wrist. This muscle is quite long, starting on the lateral side of the humerus, and attaching to the base of the second metacarpal bone (metacarpal of the index finger).

Structure
It originates from the lateral supracondylar ridge of the humerus, from the lateral intermuscular septum, and by a few fibers from the lateral epicondyle of the humerus.

The fibers end at the upper third of the forearm in a flat tendon, which runs along the lateral border of the radius, beneath the abductor pollicis longus and extensor pollicis brevis; it then passes beneath the dorsal carpal ligament, where it lies in a groove on the back of the radius common to it and the extensor carpi radialis brevis, immediately behind the styloid process.

One of the three muscles of the radial forearm group, it initially lies beside the brachioradialis, but becomes mostly tendon early on. Passing between the brachioradialis and the extensor carpi radialis brevis, this tendon continues into the second tendon compartment together with the latter muscle.

It is inserted into the dorsal surface of the base of the second metacarpal bone, on its radial side.

Innervation
The extensor carpi radialis longus is a wrist extensor that is innervated by the radial nerve, from spinal roots C6 and C7.  All other major extensor muscles in the superficial layer of the posterior compartment (the extensor digitorum, extensor carpi radialis brevis, extensor carpi ulnaris, and extensor digiti minimi) are innervated by the posterior interosseous branch of the radial nerve.

Function
As the name suggests, this muscle is an extensor at the wrist joint and travels along the radial side of the arm, so it will also abduct (radial abduction) the hand at the wrist.  That is, it manipulates the wrist so as to move the hand towards the thumb (i.e. abduction—away from the mid-position of the hand) and away from the palmar side (i.e. extension—increased angle between the palm and the front of the forearm).

Exercises
The muscle, like all extensors of the forearm, can be strengthened by exercise that resist its extension.

Example exercises
Reverse wrist curls with dumbbells can be performed.

Additional images

Notes

References 
 

Muscles of the upper limb